Fiji could be
Fijian language
Rufiji language

See also
Fiji Hindi